Tillbaks på ruta 1 is the second studio album by Patrik Isaksson, released on 15 October 2001. The album won a Rockbjörnen Award in the "Swedish album of the year" category.

Track listing
Ruta 1 - 4:07
Tillbaks igen - 4:21
Aldrig mer - 4:22
Jag ber - 4:05
Hur kan du lova mig - 4:20
En sång om bättring - 2:52
Andetag - 4:10
Människor - 4:23
Välkommen hem - 4:07
Inre ro - 4:07 - 3:43
Tillbaks på ruta 1 - 4:23

Contributors
Patrik Isaksson - singer, composer, guitar
Anders Glenmark - bass, piano
Nicci Notini-Wallin - drums

Charts

References

External links

2001 albums
Patrik Isaksson (singer) albums
Swedish-language albums